Lasocki (feminine: Lasocka; plural: Lasoccy) is a Polish surname. People with this surname include:

 Andrzej Lasocki (born 1945), Polish triple jumper
 Józef Adam Lasocki (1861–1931), Polish general
 Rafał Lasocki (born 1975), Polish footballer

See also
 

Polish-language surnames